Frederick William McKee (born 31 August 1883) was an Irish association football goalkeeper who played for, among others, Belfast-based clubs Cliftonville, Celtic and Linfield, and the national team of Ireland. At club level, McKee celebrated five Irish League titles and five Irish Cups. In 1914, he was a member of the Ireland team that won the British Home Championship - the only edition at which (united) Ireland became the unshared winners of the Championship.

Irish International

Fred McKee made his debut for Ireland at the 1906 British Home Championship on 17 March, in a 0–1 defeat to Scotland at Dalymount Park. His teammates that day included Robert Milne and Jack Kirwan. In spite of holding Wales at a 4–4 draw in his second international (the last tournament match), Ireland ended last. Much more memorable was his participation at the 1914 British Home Championship. He played all three matches, and with a clean sheet against England and only two goals conceded in his other appearances, McKee contributed to the unique victory at the British Home Championship. While the Irish team in 1903 still shared their victory with England and Scotland, this was the only occasion at which the team of (united) Ireland became sole winners.

Honours

Club
Cliftonville
 Irish League (2): 1905–06 (shared), 1909–10
 Irish Cup (2): 1906–07, 1908–09
 Belfast Charity Cup (3): 1906, 1908, 1909

Celtic
Irish League (1): 1914–15
Irish Cup (1): 1917–18

Linfield
Irish League (2): 1921–22, 1922–23
Irish Cup (2): 1921–22, 1922–23
County Antrim Shield (2): 1921–22, 1922–23

International
Ireland
British Champions (1): 1914

References

External links
 

1883 births
1956 deaths
Irish association footballers (before 1923)
Pre-1950 IFA international footballers
NIFL Premiership players
Cliftonville F.C. players
Bradford City A.F.C. players
Ulster F.C. players
Belfast Celtic F.C. players
Linfield F.C. players
Association football goalkeepers